Altayevo (Altayıw) is a rural locality (a village) in Kuzbayevsky Selsoviet, Burayevsky District, Bashkortostan, Russia. The population was 261 as of 2010. There are 2 streets.

Geography 
Altayevo is located 18 km north of Burayevo (the district's administrative centre) by road. Vanysh-Alpautovo is the nearest rural locality.

References 

Rural localities in Burayevsky District